Gaby Kennard (born 1944, East Melbourne, Victoria, Australia) was the first Australian woman to circumnavigate the globe by airplane. When she was 18 she found out that her natural father, who was an American pilot during World War II, was killed in New Guinea from a plane crash shortly after she was conceived.

She completed her commercial pilot's licence in 1984 and her multi-engine instrument rating in 1987.

In 1989, she began her journey, following Amelia Earhart's route as much as possible. The trip took 99 days and covered 29,000 nautical miles (54,000 km). In recognition of this achievement, she received the Harmon Trophy. The trip made Kennard a celebrity and she used this status to raise funds for the Royal Flying Doctor Service of Australia.

She is married to Neville Kennard and has a daughter and son.

In 2008 Kennard was awarded the Medal of the Order of Australia.

Qantas has recently announced that they will be naming one of their Airbus A380s after Gaby Kennard in recognition of her contribution to the aviation industry and particularly of her achievement.

References 

Pilotweb

1944 births
Living people
Australian aviators
Harmon Trophy winners
Aviators from Melbourne
Australian women aviators
People from East Melbourne